, there are 89 known disc golf courses in Norway on the official PDGA Course Directory. 47 of them (%) are full-size courses with 18 holes or more, and 36 of them (%) are smaller courses that feature at least 9 holes. Norway has  courses per million inhabitants.

See also 
List of disc golf courses in Austria

Notes

References 

 
Norway
Disc golf courses
Disc golf courses